Pectinases are a group of enzymes that breaks down pectin, a polysaccharide found in plant cell walls, through hydrolysis, transelimination and deesterification reactions. Commonly referred to as pectic enzymes, they include pectolyase, pectozyme, and polygalacturonase, one of the most studied and widely used commercial pectinases. It is useful because pectin is the jelly-like matrix which helps cement plant cells together and in which other cell wall components, such as cellulose fibrils, are embedded. Therefore, pectinase enzymes are commonly used in processes involving the degradation of plant materials, such as speeding up the extraction of fruit juice from fruit, including apples and sapota. Pectinases have also been used in wine production since the 1960s. The function of pectinase in brewing is twofold, first it helps break down the plant (typically fruit) material and so helps the extraction of flavors from the mash. Secondly the presence of pectin in finished wine causes a haze or slight cloudiness. Pectinase is used to break this down and so clear the wine.

Pectinases can be extracted from fungi such as Aspergillus niger. The fungus produces these enzymes to break down the middle lamella in plants so that it can extract nutrients from the plant tissues and insert fungal hyphae. If pectinase is boiled it is denatured (unfolded) making it harder to connect with the pectin at the active site, and produce as much juice.

Pectinase in Nature 
Pectinase enzymes are naturally produced by various plants, fungi, yeasts, insects, bacteria and microbes, but cannot be synthesized by animal or human cells. In plants, pectinase enzymes hydrolyze pectin that is found in the cell wall, allowing for new growth and changes to be made. Similarly to their role in plants, pectinases break down pectin during the developmental stage of fungi.

Characterizations 
Pectinase enzymes are classified based on how their enzymatic reaction proceeds with various pectic substances (through transelimination or hydrolysis), the preferred substrate (pectin, pectic acid or oligo-n-galacturonate) and if the cleavage that occurs is random or end-wise.

Reaction Pathway 
Pectinases depolymerize pectin through hydrolysis, trans-elimination and deesterification reaction processes, breaking down the ester bond that holds together the carboxyl and methyl groups in pectin.

Endo-polygalacturonase progresses through a reaction along the following pathway:

1,4-alpha-D-galacturonosyl)n+m + H2O = (1,4-alpha-D-galacturonosyl)n + (1,4-alpha-D-galacturonosyl)m

Crystal Structures 
All pectinase enzyme structures include a prism-shaped right-handed cylinder made up of seven to nine parallel β-helices. The three parallel β-helices that create the prism shape of the structure are referred to as PB1, PB2 and PB3, with PB1 and PB2 creating an antiparallel  β and PB3 sitting perpendicularly to PB2. All substrate binding sites of the various esterases, hydrolases, and lyases are located on an outer cleft of the central parallel β-helix structure between protruding loops on the structure and PB1.

Optimum environment 
As with all enzymes, pectinases have an optimum temperature and pH at which they are most active. For example, a commercial pectinase might typically be activated at 45 to 55 °C and work well at a pH of 3.0 to 6.5.

Industrial Uses 
Pectinase enzymes play various roles in both the fruit juice and wine industries. They are used for clarification in fruit juices and also speed up fruit juice extraction through enzymatic liquefaction of fruit pulp. In addition, pectinase enzymes aid in formation of pulpy products in the fruit juice industry. Pectinase enzymes are used for extracting juice from purée. This is done when the enzyme pectinase breaks down the substrate pectin and the juice is extracted. The enzyme pectinase lowers the activation energy needed for the juice to be produced and catalyzes the reaction.

Pectinases are useful in the wine industry by extracting anthocyanin from the fruit, effectively intensifying the wine coloring. Pectinase can also be used to extract juices from cell walls of plants cells.

Pectinases are also used for retting in the textile industry. Addition of chelating agents or pretreatment of the plant material with acid enhance the effect of the enzyme.

References

EC 3.2.1